Orany may be:
the Polish name of Varėna, a city in Lithuania
Orany, Ukraine, a village in Ukraine

See also 
 Orani (disambiguation)
 , a region of western Algeria